Manuel Estêvão Fernandes Anjos Sanches, known as Puma (born April 21, 1979 in Lisboa)  is a Cape Verdean international footballer who last played for Alki Larnaca in 2009 and also played for Enosis Neon Paralimni in the Cypriot First Division.

He has also played for Naval 1º de Maio and Vitória F.C.

He has represented Cape Verde on numerous occasions. He also holds a Portugal passport.

Honours
Vitória Setúbal
Taça de Portugal: 2004–05

References

External links
 
 zerozero.pt
 Player Statistics - ForaDeJogo.net

1979 births
Living people
Cape Verdean footballers
Cape Verde international footballers
Portuguese people of Cape Verdean descent
S.C. Braga B players
S.C. Dragões Sandinenses players
S.C. Braga players
Vitória F.C. players
Associação Naval 1º de Maio players
F.C. Maia players
Aris Limassol FC players
Alki Larnaca FC players
Enosis Neon Paralimni FC players
Primeira Liga players
Cypriot First Division players
Cypriot Second Division players
Association football midfielders
People from Lisbon
Expatriate footballers in Cyprus
Cape Verdean expatriate sportspeople in Cyprus